Keidean Coleman (born 31 March 2000) is an Australian rules footballer who plays for the Brisbane Lions in the Australian Football League (AFL).

Early life
Coleman was born in Katherine, Northern Territory to a family of Indigenous Australian descent (Dalabon and Jawoyn). At nine years of age he moved to Brisbane for better education opportunities and to pursue a career in football. While in Brisbane, he initially played junior football for the Wynnum Vikings before switching to Morningside to play in the top level QAFL competition. He impressed enough to be placed in the Brisbane Lions developmental academy and was considered a future AFL prospect in the lead up to his draft year. However, he was overlooked at the 2018 AFL draft but decided to remain a part of Brisbane's academy program as an overage player. The decision paid off when Brisbane drafted Coleman with pick 37 in the 2019 AFL draft, matching a bid by Essendon.  This in itself wasn’t without controversy as Brisbane did not have the required draft points to match the bid. Brisbane had to complete many trades to facilitate the bid and took more than their allocated time by nearly ten minutes, with the AFL breaking its own draft rules to allow it. Coleman attended Brisbane Bayside State College throughout his high school years.

AFL career
Coleman made his debut for the Brisbane Lions' 8 point win over Collingwood in the 15th round of the 2020 AFL season. On debut, Coleman picked up 12 disposals, 4 marks and 4 tackles.

Statistics
Updated to the end of the 2022 season.

|-
| 2020 ||  || 18
| 5 || 2 || 1 || 25 || 17 || 42 || 9 || 23 || 0.4 || 0.2 || 5.0 || 3.4 || 8.4 || 1.8 || 4.6
|-
| 2021 ||  || 18
| 18 || 6 || 5 || 89 || 73 || 162 || 44 || 32 || 0.3 || 0.3 || 4.9 || 4.1 || 9.0 || 2.4 || 1.8
|-
| 2022 ||  || 18
| 18 || 4 || 1 || 234 || 92 || 326 || 107 || 44 || 0.2 || 0.0 || 13.0 || 5.1 || 18.1 || 5.9 || 2.4
|- class=sortbottom
! colspan=3 | Career
! 41 !! 12 !! 7 !! 348 !! 182 !! 530 !! 160 !! 100 !! 0.2 !! 0.1 !! 8.4 !! 4.4 !! 12.9 !! 3.9 !! 2.4
|}

Notes

References

External links

2000 births
Living people
Australian rules footballers from Queensland
Australian rules footballers from the Northern Territory
Brisbane Lions players